The Hole is a 1960 French crime film directed by Jacques Becker. It is an adaptation of José Giovanni's 1957 book The Break. It was called The Night Watch when first released in the United States, but is released under its French title today. The film is based on a true event concerning five prison inmates in La Santé Prison in France in 1947. Becker, who died just weeks after shooting had wrapped, cast mostly non-actors for the main roles, including one man (Jean Keraudy) who was actually involved in the 1947 escape attempt, and who introduces the film. It was entered into the 1960 Cannes Film Festival.

Plot
Gaspard, a very polite prisoner, is moved to a cell (block 11, cell 6) designed for, and containing, four inmates due to repair works in his block. The cellmates keep busy making cardboard boxes.

Gaspard receives a food parcel from his mistress and has to watch while the guard chops up the sausages and prods the jams, searching for concealed tools.

The four existing cellmates expect long prison sentences, ranging from 10 years to possibly execution by guillotine, and have a pre-existing plan to escape. Gaspard himself is accused of the attempted murder of his wife, and faces a potential 20-year sentence.

Gaspard shares his food parcel with the four and gains their confidence sufficiently for them to reveal their escape plan: digging a hole through the floor to reach the underground passages. The bulk of the film then focuses upon their gradual progress, which results in two men reaching an outer manhole in the public street outside the prison walls. However, the two do not escape, and instead return to the cell to organize the timing of the group escape. Geo decides not to join.

But, just as they are ready to go, Gaspard gets called to a meeting with the governor, and is told his wife has withdrawn the charges; and that he will be released soon.  Returning to the cell, Gaspard has to dispel the suspicions of his cellmates, that he had turned them in. However, in the last moments before the four are about to leave through their tunnel, a group of guards appears outside and they realize that they have been betrayed. A fight ensues in the cell and the guards intervene.

As Gaspard is returned to his original cell, the original four have been stripped to their underwear (before going into solitary confinement). But Gaspard too has been cheated, as the governor has a reputation for swapping information for supposed release rumours. Whether or not his wife has dropped the charges the state still wishes to prosecute.

Cast
 Michel Constantin as Geo Cassine
 Marc Michel as Claude Gaspard
 Jean Keraudy as Roland Darbant
 Philippe Leroy as Manu Borelli (José Giovanni)
 Raymond Meunier as Vossellin / Monseigneur
 Jean-Paul Coquelin as Lieutenant Grinval
 André Bervil as the director
 Eddy Rasimi as Bouboule
 Gérard Hernandez as a prisoner
 Dominique Zardi as a prisoner
 Paul Préboist as a guard
 Catherine Spaak as Nicole (uncredited)

Production
According to the 1964 press materials that are included in The Criterion Collection DVD, Jacques Becker first read of the 1947 La Santé Prison escape attempt in a newspaper.  Years later, he found out that José Giovanni had fictionalized the same escape attempt in his 1957 novel The Break. Becker contacted Giovanni's publisher, Gallimard, and Becker and Giovanni collaborated on the screenplay of Le Trou.

During production, Becker hired three of the attempted escapees as technical consultants. One of the consultants, Roland Barbat (using the stage name Jean Keraudy), appears in the film as the character Roland Darbant, who plans the escape tunnel and improvises all the tools they use.

Barbat also appears at the beginning of the film as himself, working on a Citroën 2CV. (Barbat became a mechanic after prison.)  He states directly to the camera that we are about to see his true story.

Style
The black and white cinematography is by Ghislain Cloquet (Mickey One, Au hasard Balthazar, Tess).

The scene where three different characters take turns breaking through the concrete floor of their cell is filmed in a single, nearly four minute long, shot.

There is no musical score except under the end credits.

The film has no opening credits.

Reception 
Le Trou has a Rotten Tomatoes score of 94% based on 17 reviews, with an average score of 8.59/10. Dave Kehr, writing for Chicago Reader, hailed it as "the last great flowering of French classicism; the 'tradition of quality' here goes out with a masterpiece." The New York Times''' Bosley Crowther noted that the non-professional actors "play their roles with such simple, natural force that they become not only bold adventurers but also deeply appreciable friends." "As long as men have been placed behind bars" wrote Kenneth Turan, "they've plotted to escape, and those plans have powered prison-break movies without end. But even in that large group, "Le Trou" stands apart."

Whilst praising the film otherwise, Richard Brody of The New Yorker'' wrote that Becker's "deeply empathetic, fanatically specific view of his protagonists leaves out some elements. [José] Giovanni was no common criminal—a Nazi collaborator, he blackmailed, tortured, and murdered Jews during, and even after, the Occupation. The charm of France’s underworld depended not just on criminals’ own code of silence but on Becker’s, and on all of France’s."

See also 
 A Man Escaped

References

External links
 
 
 
 The Time It Takes: Le Trou and Jacques Becker an essay by Chris Fujiwara at the Criterion Collection
 Info at filsdefrance
 Trailer for Rialto Pictures 2017 release

1960 films
French black-and-white films
1960 crime drama films
Crime films based on actual events
Films based on works by José Giovanni
Films directed by Jacques Becker
1960s French-language films
French prison films
Titanus films
Films produced by Serge Silberman
Films with screenplays by José Giovanni
1960s French films